Senator Griggs may refer to:

John W. Griggs (1849–1927), New Jersey State Senate
Ron Griggs (born 1952), New Mexico State Senate